Coryn Labecki (née Rivera; born August 26, 1992) is an American racing cyclist of Filipino descent, who currently rides for UCI Women's WorldTeam .

As of June 2018 Labecki has won 72 national titles, taking her first elite level national championship with the 2014 USA National Criterium championships. and her most recent, the Elite Women's Road Race USA national title, in June 2018.

Major results

Road

2006
 National Junior Road Championships
1st  Road race
1st  Time trial
1st  Criterium
2007
 National Debutant Road Championships
1st  Road race
1st  Time trial
1st  Criterium
 1st Criterium, California State Championships
 1st Overall Le Tour de L'Avenir du Saguenay
2008
 National Novice Road Championships
1st  Road race
1st  Time trial
 1st Criterium, California State Championships
2009
 National Junior Road Championships
1st  Road race
2nd Time trial
 1st Cascade Cycling Classic Criterium
 1st San Rafael Twilight Criterium
 1st Manhattan Beach Grand Prix
 1st San Pedro Grand Prix
2010
 National Junior Road Championships
1st  Road race
1st  Time trial
1st  Criterium
 1st Sacramento Grand Prix
 1st Stage 3 Tulsa Tough
 3rd  Road race, UCI Juniors Road World Championships
 3rd Dana Point Grand Prix
2011
 1st  Criterium, National Under-23 Road Championships
 1st Criterium, California State Championships
 1st Pittsburgh Twilight Criterium
 1st San Rafael Twilight Criterium
 1st Watsonville Strawberry Criterium 
 2nd Quad Cities Criterium
 7th Overall Tour Féminin en Limousin
1st Young rider classification
1st Stage 1
2012
 National Collegiate Road Championships
1st  Team time trial (with Sinead Miller, Jackie Kurth & Kaitlin Antonneau)
1st  Team road race
2013
 5th Sparkassen Giro Bochum
2014
 1st  Criterium, National Road Championships
 1st River Parks Criterium
 1st River Parks Omnium
 1st Tour of Utah
 1st Tour de Lafayette
 1st Tour de Francis Park
 1st Giro della Montagna
 1st TD Bank Mayor's Cup
 North Star Grand Prix
1st Sprints classification
1st Stages 2 & 4
 6th La Course by Le Tour de France
2015
 1st Overall Armed Forces Association Cycling Classic
1st Crystal Cup
 Redlands Bicycle Classic
1st Stages 4 & 5
 1st Stage 5 Thüringen Rundfahrt der Frauen
 1st Stage 3 Women's USA Pro Cycling Challenge
 2nd  Road race, Pan American Road Championships
 2nd Road race, National Road Championships
 4th Omloop van het Hageland
 4th Winston-Salem Cycling Classic
 5th Philadelphia Cycling Classic
 6th Overall Joe Martin Stage Race
1st  Points classification
1st Stage 3
2016
 1st  Overall Joe Martin Stage Race
1st  Points classification
1st Stages 2 & 3
 1st Charlotte Criterium
 1st Cannon Falls Road Race, North Star Bicycle Festival
 1st Clarendon Cup
 1st Stage 1 Tour Femenino de San Luis
 2nd Road race, National Road Championships
 2nd Gran Prix San Luis Femenino
 3rd Winston-Salem Cycling Classic
 9th Overall Tour of California
 9th Acht van Westerveld
 10th Overall Thüringen Rundfahrt der Frauen
1st Stage 7
2017
 1st  Team time trial, UCI Road World Championships
 1st Trofeo Alfredo Binda-Comune di Cittiglio
 1st Tour of Flanders for Women
 1st Prudential RideLondon Classique
 1st East West Bikes Anniversary Challenge
 2nd Road race, National Road Championships
 2nd Women's Tour de Yorkshire
 2nd Madrid Challenge by La Vuelta
 3rd Gent–Wevelgem
 4th Acht van Westerveld
 4th Erondegemse Pijl
 6th Overall Tour of California
1st Stage 3
 6th Overall Belgium Tour
 6th Amstel Gold Race
 7th La Flèche Wallonne Féminine
2018
 1st  Road race, National Road Championships
 1st  Overall The Women's Tour
1st  Sprints classification
1st Stage 2
 Ladies Tour of Norway
1st Team time trial
3rd Overall Stage race
 2nd Overall Madrid Challenge by La Vuelta
1st Stage 1 (TTT)
 Open de Suède Vårgårda
2nd Team time trial
8th Road race
 3rd  Team time trial, UCI Road World Championships
 3rd GP de Plouay – Bretagne
 4th Overall Thüringen Rundfahrt der Frauen
1st  Points classification
1st Stages 1 & 3
 5th Omloop Het Nieuwsblad
 6th Ronde van Drenthe
 6th Prudential RideLondon Classique
2019
 2nd Road race, National Road Championships
 2nd Overall Ladies Tour of Norway
 2nd GP de Plouay – Bretagne
 3rd Brabantse Pijl
 3rd RideLondon Classique
 3rd MerXem Classic
 3rd Postnord UCI WWT Vårgårda West Sweden TTT
 4th Overall Belgium Tour
1st  Points classification
1st Stages 3 & 4
 8th Trofeo Alfredo Binda-Comune di Cittiglio
 10th Road race, UCI Road World Championships
2021
 1st Stage 10 Giro Rosa
 2nd Road race, National Road Championships
 7th Road race, Summer Olympics
 8th GP de Plouay
 10th Road race, UCI Road World Championships
2022
 6th Trofeo Alfredo Binda-Comune di Cittiglio
 9th Amstel Gold Race

Classics results timeline

Track

2006
 1st  Team sprint, National Junior Championships (with Colleen Hayduk)
2007
 National Debutant Championships
1st  Team sprint
1st  Omnium
 1st Omnium, California State Championships
2008
 1st  Team sprint, National Junior Championships (with Colleen Hayduk)
 National Novice Championships
1st  500m time trial
1st  Scratch
1st  Points race
1st  Omnium
2nd Sprint
 California State Championships
1st Omnium
1st Team sprint (with Christine Barron)
2009
 National Junior Championships
1st  Individual pursuit
1st  Team sprint
2nd Points race
2010
 National Junior Championships
1st  Keirin
1st  Points race
1st  Individual pursuit
1st  Sprint
2nd Scratch
3rd Team sprint
 3rd  Omnium, UCI Junior Track Cycling World Championships
2011
 National Collegiate Championships
1st  Omnium
1st  Team omnium
1st  Individual pursuit
1st  Team pursuit
1st  Points race
1st  Sprint

Cyclo-cross

2006
 1st  Debutants race, National Championships
 1st California State Championships
2007
 1st  Debutants race, National Championships
 1st California State Championships
2008
 1st  Junior race, National Championships
 1st California State Championships
2009
 1st  Junior race, National Championships
2012
 1st  National Collegiate Championships
 National Championships
2nd Under-23 race
5th Elite race

References

External links
 
 
 
 
 
 
 
 
 

1992 births
Living people
American female cyclists
American sportspeople of Filipino descent
People from Garden Grove, California
Olympic cyclists of the United States
Cyclists at the 2020 Summer Olympics
21st-century American women